In probability theory, especially as that field is used in statistics, a group family of probability distributions is a family obtained by subjecting a random variable with a fixed distribution to a suitable family of transformations such as a location-scale family, or otherwise a family of probability distributions acted upon by a group.

Consideration of a particular family of distributions as a group family can, in statistical theory, lead to the identification of an ancillary statistic.

Types of group families 
A group family can be generated by subjecting a random variable with a fixed distribution to some suitable transformations. Different types of group families are as follows :

Location Family 

This family is obtained by adding a constant to a random variable. Let  be a random variable and  be a constant. Let  .

Scale Family 

This family is obtained by multiplying a random variable with a constant. Let  be a random variable and  be a constant. Let  . Then

Location - Scale Family 

This family is obtained by multiplying a random variable with a constant and then adding some other constant to it. Let  be a random variable ,  and be constants. Let . Then 

Properties of the transformations 
The transformation applied to the random variable must satisfy the following properties.
 Closure under composition 
 Closure under inversion

References 

Parametric statistics
Types of probability distributions